Maria Aurora Lopes was a São Toméan politician. She was one of the first group of female members of the National Assembly in 1975.

Biography
In December 1975 Lopes was appointed to the National Assembly as one of the first group of six women in the legislature.

References

Date of birth unknown
São Tomé and Príncipe women in politics
Members of the National Assembly (São Tomé and Príncipe)
Movement for the Liberation of São Tomé and Príncipe/Social Democratic Party politicians
Possibly living people
20th-century São Tomé and Príncipe politicians
20th-century women politicians